Tatlybayevo (Tatlıbay) is a rural locality (a selo) and the administrative centre of Tatlybayevsky Selsoviet, Baymaksky District, Bashkortostan, Russia. The population was 331 as of 2010. There are 5 streets.

Geography 
Tatlybayevo is located 35 km east of Baymak (the district's administrative centre) by road. Abdrakhmanovo is the nearest rural locality.

References 

Rural localities in Baymaksky District